The 2004–05 Kategoria Superiore was the 69th season of top-tier football in Albania and the seventh season under the name Kategoria Superiore.

Teams

Stadia and last season

League table

Results
Each team plays every opponent four times, twice at home and twice away, for a total of 36 games.

First half of season

Second half of season

Season statistics

Top goalscorers

Hat-tricks

Notes

References

External links
Albania - List of final tables (RSSSF)

Albanian Superliga
Kategoria Superiore seasons
1